Bobby Allen Lane (born October 30, 1939) is a former American football linebacker who played in eight games over two seasons with the San Diego Chargers of the American Football League (AFL). He was drafted by the Los Angeles Rams in the eleventh round of the 1961 NFL Draft. He was also drafted by the Dallas Texans in the 20th round of the 1961 AFL Draft. Lane first enrolled at Cerritos College before transferring to Baylor University. He attended Bellflower High School in Bellflower, California.

References

External links
Just Sports Stats

Living people
1939 births
Players of American football from Oklahoma
American football linebackers
Cerritos Falcons football players
Baylor Bears football players
San Diego Chargers players
People from Wagoner, Oklahoma
American Football League players